Aroga pascuicola is a moth of the family Gelechiidae. It is found in Portugal, Spain and Russia, as well as on Corsica and Sardinia. It has also been recorded from Algeria and Turkey.

References

Moths described in 1871
Aroga
Moths of Europe
Moths of Africa
Moths of Asia